"The Gold Bug" is a  science fiction story by American writer Orson Scott Card, set in his Ender's Game universe.  It tells the story of how Sel Menach steps aside as leader of a colony world to let Ender Wiggin take over as governor.  It appears in Card's Webzine InterGalactic Medicine Show, and was incorporated into Card's novel Ender in Exile.

Plot summary
"The Gold Bug" is the story of Sel Menach, a fighter pilot in the Formic war, xenobiologist, and eventually the governor of one of the former Formics worlds. When a colony ship from Earth arrives, carrying Ender Wiggin, the new soon-to-be governor, Sel decides to go on an expedition into unexplored lands so that it will be easier for Ender to take over as governor.  On the expedition, Sel discovers some caves with large golden bugs, which he believes to be a cross between the Formics and a parasite native to the planet.  He establishes some limited contact with the hybrid creatures and discovers they are hungry and want to be fed and while he brings that food, Ender shows up, arranges for the bugs to be fed, and takes Sel back to the colony and his work as a xenobiologist.

Relationship to "A Young Man with Prospects"
According to Card, while he was writing this story, he started to think about how Ender got to the colony and as a result, came up with a story involving a power struggle between Ender and the ship's captain.  However, since Card didn't want the story to be only about Ender and the captain, he decided to put a mother and daughter on the ship and the story of the two women, originally meant as an opening for the story evolved into the short story "A Young Man with Prospects".

Publication history
"The Gold Bug" was published in the July 2007 issue of Intergalactic Medicine Show.  It was republished in 2011 in the anthology Alien Contact by Marty Halpern. It was also adapted into an Ender comic and can be found as an added bonus in the Marvel Comics hardcover edition of Red Prophet: The Tales Of Alvin Maker. Parts of this story occur in Chapters 14, 15, and 16 of Card's novel Ender in Exile.

References

Ender's Game series short stories
Short stories by Orson Scott Card
Works originally published in InterGalactic Medicine Show
2007 short stories
ABC Weekend Special